Driebergen is a former village and municipality in the Dutch province of Utrecht. It is first mentioned as Thriberghen in 1159.  The former municipality of Driebergen existed until 1931, when it merged with Rijsenburg, to create the new municipality of Driebergen-Rijsenburg. 
In later years, due to growth of the villages of Driebergen and Rijsenburg, the villages themselves also merged, to become the single town of Driebergen-Rijsenburg. 
Since 2006, Driebergen-Rijsenburg has been part of the new municipality of Utrechtse Heuvelrug.

Transport
Driebergen-Zeist railway station

References

External links

Former populated places in the Netherlands
Populated places in Utrecht (province)
Former municipalities of Utrecht (province)
Utrechtse Heuvelrug